The International Piano Academy Lake Como is a piano academy.

Administration
President of Honor: Martha Argerich
President and Artistic Director: William Grant Naboré
Vice President: Stanislav Ioudenitch

Location and facility

The majestic Palazzo del Vescovo (Palace of the Bishop) was erected by the family of the Marquis Cossoni in the 17th century. In 1854 Carlo Romanò, the Bishop of Como, acquired the building from the heirs of the family Cossoni.

In 1983 the Town of Dongo purchased the building, and with the financial help of the Comunità Montana Alto Lario Occidentale, the citizens of Dongo embarked on a complete restoration of the Palazzo.

Today the building, which still retains its former name, houses the Civic Institute of Music "Alto Lario" and, since December 2003, the International Piano Academy Lake Como.

Some notable graduates of the International Piano Academy Lake Como

Behzod Abduraimov
Yulianna Avdeeva
Gabriele Baldocci
Chi-Ho Han
Alessandro Deljavan
Shani Diluka
François Dumont
Severin von Eckardstein
Martina Filjak
Kirill Gerstein
Jonathan Gilad
Martin Helmchen
Benjamin Kim
Denis Kozhukhin
Ingmar Lazar
Claire-Marie Le Guay
Marcos Madrigal
Dmitry Masleev
Cédric Pescia
Roberto Plano
Enrico Pompili
Yevgeny Sudbin
Alessandro Taverna
Alexei Volodin
Shiran Wang
Daniel Wnukowski

External links
Official Website of the International Piano Academy Lake Como
Official Website of the Lake Como International Piano Foundation founded by William Grant Naboré

Music schools in Italy